"The Angel God Sent From Heaven" is a World War I era American song published in 1918. Frank L. Ventre composed the music, while Paul A. Smith and Robert Levenson wrote the lyrics. It was published by Jack Mendehlsohn Music Company in Boston, Massachusetts. The song was written for both voice and piano. The cover was illustrated by the Dobinson Engraving Company. On the cover is a drawing of a nurse. Under her picture is a car and soldiers.

The lyrics are told from the point of view of a soldier's mother. Although she is concerned about her son's safety, she doesn't worry because "God sent a shining angel to take [her] place". The angel she refers to is a Red Cross nurse. The chorus is as follows: 

Pritzker Military Museum & Library has a copy of the sheet music.

References

1918 songs
Songs of World War I
Songs with lyrics by Robert Levenson